Jeon So-nee (born March 20, 1991) is a South Korean actress under Management SOOP. In 2020, she starred in the Korean television series When My Love Blooms alongside Park Jinyoung.

Early life
Jeon's mother is Ko Jae-sook of the 1970s K-pop musical duo . She graduated from the Seoul Institute of the Arts.

Career
Jeon made her acting debut through the independent film Photo in 2014 while attending the Department of Broadcasting Entertainment at Seoul Institute of the Arts. She decided to become an actress when she worked on short films with film majors during college. In January 2018, she was selected as one of the most notable new actresses of 2018 in the 1140th issue of Cine 21.

Jeon received attention through her supporting role in Encounter as Park Bo-gum’s friend. She gained her first lead television role through the tvN drama When My Love Blooms in April 2020 alongside Yoo Ji-tae, Lee Bo-young and Park Jinyoung. In July 2020, Jeon was confirmed to star in the Korean remake of Chinese film Soul Mate alongside Kim Da-mi and Byeon Woo-seok. On December 31, she was confirmed as the female lead of KakaoTV drama Writing Your Fate alongside Ki Do-hoon.

Filmography

Film

Television series

Music video appearances

Awards and nominations

References

External links
 
 
 

1991 births
Living people
South Korean film actresses
South Korean television actresses
21st-century South Korean actresses